This is a list of commemorative postage stamps issued by the India Post between 1981 and 1990.

1981

1982

1983

1984

1985

1986

1987

1988

1989

1990

References

External links
 Catalogue of Indian Postage Stamps

Postage stamps of India
India